39 Avenue is a Ctrain LRT station on the  (south leg) of the CTrain light rail system in Manchester,  Calgary, Alberta opened on May 25, 1981, as part of the original South line. The station is located on the exclusive LRT right of way 3.4 km south of the City Hall Interlocking, at 39 Avenue SE, just east of Macleod Trail.

It is located near the north end of a short tunnel that passes underneath 42nd Avenue. 229 parking spaces are available at the station on both sides. The station consists of two side-loading platforms and is completely at grade. 39 Avenue Station is the most exposed station to the elements as there is no canopy at all, unlike every other LRT station.

Formerly called 42 Avenue because 42 Avenue is a major commercial roadway in the area. In 1986, the station was renamed 39 Avenue to better indicate where it is located.

Calgary Transit is planning to operate four-car trains by the end of 2014. As a result, all three-car platforms are being extended. Construction work to extend the platform southwards started in April 2014 and finished in July 2014.

In 2005, the station registered an average transit volume of 3,600 boardings per weekday.

References

CTrain stations
Railway stations in Canada opened in 1981